Gerrit Glas (born 31 August 1954, Bennekom) studied Medicine at the University of Amsterdam and Philosophy at the Vrije Universiteit. He worked as a psychiatrist at the Ziekenhuis Zwolse Poort in the Netherlands and got his promotion in 1990 on the subject anxiety disorder. Since 1991, he has been a professor of Reformational philosophy at the Universiteit van Leiden. Since 2008 he has been Professor of Christian Philosophy (Dooyeweerd chair) at the VU University Amsterdam. He has written a broad chapter about Anthropology in the book Kennis en werkelijkheid. Glas is associated with the Association for Reformational Philosophy. Along with prof. dr. ir. Henk Jochemsen, he wrote the book Verantwoord medisch handelen.

References 

 Faculty page at Leiden University

1954 births
Living people
20th-century Dutch philosophers
21st-century Dutch philosophers
Dutch psychiatrists
Calvinist and Reformed philosophers
Protestant Church Christians from the Netherlands
People from Ede, Netherlands
University of Amsterdam alumni 
Vrije Universiteit Amsterdam alumni 
Utrecht University alumni 
Academic staff of Leiden University
Academic staff of Vrije Universiteit Amsterdam